Jerome Patrick Cavanagh (June 16, 1928 – November 27, 1979)  was an American politician who served as the mayor of Detroit, Michigan from 1962 to 1970. Initially seen as another John F. Kennedy, his reputation was doomed by the 1967 riots. He was the first mayor to reside at Manoogian Mansion, donated to the city by the industrial baron Alex Manoogian.

Early life and family
Jerome P. Cavanagh was born on June 16, 1928, in Detroit, the son of Mary Irene (Timmins) and Sylvester J. Cavanaugh, a boilermaker at Ford Motor Company. He attended the University of Detroit, earning an undergraduate degree in 1950 and a law degree in 1954, and practiced law in Detroit after graduation. He was active in Democratic Party politics while attending school, and afterward served in low-level appointed positions as an administrative assistant at the Michigan State Fair Authority and as a member of the Metropolitan Airport Board of Zoning Appeals. Cavanagh was a Roman Catholic. He is the brother of Mike Cavanagh, a former Justice of the Michigan Supreme Court (1983–2014) and father of eight children, among whom are Mark Jerome Cavanagh, since 1989 a judge on the Michigan Court of Appeals, David Peter Cavanagh and Christopher Francis Cavanagh (both former Wayne County Commissioners), and Phil Cavanagh (a former member of the Michigan House of Representatives).

1961 mayoral campaign
In his first campaign ever, the 33-year-old Cavanagh entered the 1961 Detroit mayoral race, one of eleven candidates in the nonpartisan primary opposing incumbent Louis Miriani.  None of these candidates was seen as serious opposition to Miriani, who had an enormous amount of institutional support and had easily won the mayoral race four years earlier.  Cavanagh ran second to Miriani in the primary, earning a slot in the general election, but received less than half the primary votes Miriani did.  However, Cavanagh campaigned relentlessly, criticizing Miriani's handling of Detroit's financial affairs and race relations with the city's African-American community. Many in the black community believed Miriani condoned police brutality.  On election day, black voters turned out in force, and Cavanagh stunned political observers by defeating the incumbent Miriani.

Mayoralty
Cavanagh got off to a popular start as mayor, appointing a reformer to be chief of police and implementing an affirmative action program for most city agencies.  Unlike Richard J. Daley, who resisted forced implementation of the American civil rights movement, Jerry Cavanagh welcomed Martin Luther King Jr. to Detroit, and marched with him in June 1963 down Woodward Avenue in the 100,000 strong Detroit Walk to Freedom.

Cavanagh was successful in receiving money from the U.S. federal government through the Model Cities Program.  New skyscrapers were built downtown.  The Model Cities Program was a key component of President Lyndon B. Johnson's Great Society and War on Poverty. Begun in 1966, it operated five-year-long experiments in 150 cities to develop new antipoverty programs and alternative forms of municipal government. The ambitious federal urban aid program succeeded in fostering a new generation of mostly black urban leaders.  Detroit was one of the largest Model Cities projects. Mayor Cavanagh was the only elected official to serve on Johnson's task force. Detroit received widespread acclaim for its leadership in the program, which used $490 million to try to turn a nine-square-mile section of the city (with 134,000 inhabitants) into a model city.  The city's political and business elite, and city planners, along with the black middle class, wanted federal funding to assist the economic growth of the entire city. They sought to protect the central business district property values from nearby slums and to construct new revenue-generating structures. However local community organizers and civil rights activists rallied poor residents in opposition to these plans. They said federal renewal funding should be used to replace deteriorating housing stock, whether with new public housing or low-cost housing built by private developers. The Model City program was terminated in Detroit and nationwide in 1974 after major race riots in most of its target cities.

Well-informed observers believed that Detroit had extinguished the embers of resentment left over from the 1943 Detroit Race Riot.

For example, Fortune magazine commented:

Nor was Detroit doing so badly economically. The National Observer commented:

In the face of this optimism, Cavanagh was reelected overwhelmingly in 1965. In 1966, Cavanagh was elected president of both the United States Conference of Mayors and the National League of Cities, the only mayor to hold both posts at the same time. He served as president of the United States Conference of Mayors until the following year.

1967 riots
However, deeper problems existed under the surface. After World War II, the automobile industry, requiring more lateral space than was available in a city, and desiring to avoid city taxes, decentralized its operations.  As with other cities, Detroiters were leaving Detroit for its suburbs by the thousands by 1967.  Some 22,000 residents, mostly white, moved to the suburbs in 1966 alone, following new auto plants and new housing, or using the newly constructed Interstate system to commute into Detroit.  

Detroit faced serious financial trouble. Cavanagh had inherited a $28 million budget gap in 1962.  To close the gap, and to pay for the new programs he wanted to implement, Cavanagh had pushed through the legislature income and commuter taxes for Detroit, but these proved unpopular with residents and businesses.

On July 23, 1967, a police attempt to break up an illegal party escalated into what would be known as the 12th Street Riot. Feeling a large police presence would make things worse, Cavanagh acted slowly to stop the riots. Late Sunday afternoon, Cavanaugh and city officials met at the 10th precinct with black community leaders and neighborhood activists. When asked why it took so long to call in the guard, Cavanaugh replied "because they're all white. Were leery about that." The riots lasted for five days, killed 43 people, made over 5,000 people homeless, and required two divisions of federal paratroopers to be put down; they were the worst of the four hundred or so riots that American cities experienced in the 1960s.  Cavanagh himself had to admit in July 1967, "Today we stand amidst the ashes of our hopes. We hoped against hope that what we had been doing was enough to prevent a riot. It was not enough."

The prior summer in 1966, a potential riot that began on Kercheval Street on the east side of Detroit, was successfully prevented at its inception. This, in addition to the generally accepted view that Detroit and its reputation as a “Model City," led to the belief that Detroit might not suffer the same race-related troubles many other cities had. Thus, 1967 came as a complete surprise and shock to Cavanagh and many other city officials. In addition, Cavanagh was procedurally limited in his ability to control the riots as it was the role of Governor George Romney to ask for Federal assistance once it appeared local resources might not be sufficient. However, Romney was seen as a potential Republican presidential opponent of President Lyndon Johnson, and there is considerable evidence that the delay by Johnson in sending troops was partly based on an effort to stymie Romney. When troops were finally called in, it was too late. Cavanagh believed that a prompt federal response may very well have greatly reduced the severity of the riots. Cavanagh chose not to run for reelection in 1969.

Later career
The latter part of Cavanagh's second term was also difficult for him personally, in addition to the pressure from the aftermath of the riots.  Cavanagh ran for the United States Senate in 1966 but lost in the Democratic primary to former governor G. Mennen Williams.  In July 1967, Cavanagh's wife Mary Helen filed for separation, and the couple split the custody of their eight children.  In October, Cavanagh counter-sued, and in 1968 the couple went through a contentious and public divorce.

After Cavanagh left office, he returned to his private law practice in Detroit and was also one of the first adjunct professors at the newly created Public Policy Department (later renamed The Gerald Ford Public Policy Institute) at the University of Michigan.  In 1974, Cavanagh again ran for office, this time for Governor, but lost in the primary election to Democrat Sander Levin, who later lost in the general election to Republican William Milliken. It was Cavanagh's last attempt at political office.

Cavanagh died of a heart attack on November 27, 1979, at St. Joseph Hospital in Lexington, Kentucky, while visiting a client in that city. He was 51 years old. He is buried in Mt. Elliott Cemetery in Detroit.

References

Further reading
 Jerome Cavanagh Personal Papers at the Walter P. Reuther Library in Detroit. This collection includes over 300 linear feet of correspondence, reports, studies, speeches, minutes, and other materials of the mayor's office and commissions and departments of the city.
 Fine, Sidney. Violence in the Model City: The Cavanaugh Administration, Race Relations, and the Detroit Riot of 1967 (1989)
 Turrini, Joseph. "Phooie on Louie: African American Detroit and the Election of Jerry Cavanagh", Michigan History, Nov./Dec. 1999. online

External links

1928 births
1979 deaths
Mayors of Detroit
University of Detroit Mercy alumni
Michigan Democrats
20th-century American politicians
Presidents of the United States Conference of Mayors